Christoph Eimer (born 12 March 1977, in Neuss) is a German former field hockey player who competed in the 2000 Summer Olympics and in the 2004 Summer Olympics.

References

External links

1977 births
Living people
Sportspeople from Neuss
German male field hockey players
Olympic field hockey players of Germany
Field hockey players at the 2000 Summer Olympics
Field hockey players at the 2004 Summer Olympics
Olympic bronze medalists for Germany
Olympic medalists in field hockey
Medalists at the 2004 Summer Olympics
1998 Men's Hockey World Cup players
2002 Men's Hockey World Cup players
21st-century German people